André Robert Bossert (born 14 November 1963) is a Swiss professional golfer.

Early life and education
Bossert was born to Swiss parents in Johannesburg, South Africa, and played college golf at Oral Roberts University and University of Tulsa in the United States.

Professional career
Bossert turned professional in 1989 and has played on the European Tour, the Southern Africa-based Sunshine Tour and the second tier European Challenge Tour. The main highlight of his career was his sole European Tour victory, which came in 1995 at the Air France Cannes Open. He was the first Swiss winner on the European Tour. He has also won the 1990 Neuchâtel Open and the 1992 Kenya Open on the Challenge Tour. He has represented his country in international team competitions several times.

Professional wins (10)

European Tour wins (1)

*Note: The 1995 Air France Cannes Open was shortened to 36 holes due to rain.

Challenge Tour wins (3)

Challenge Tour playoff record (1–1)

Other wins (5)
1991 Swiss Omnium
2000 Swiss PGA Championship
2001 Swiss Doubles Championship
2002 Davidoff Nations Cup (with Marc Chatelain)
2007 Swiss Omnium

European Senior Tour wins (1)

Results in major championships

CUT = missed the halfway cut
Note: Bossert only played in The Open Championship.

Team appearances
Amateur
Eisenhower Trophy (representing Switzerland): 1988

Professional
World Cup (representing Switzerland): 1990, 1991, 1992, 1994, 1995, 1996, 2002
Dunhill Cup (representing Switzerland): 1991

References

External links

Swiss male golfers
European Tour golfers
Sunshine Tour golfers
European Senior Tour golfers
PGA Tour Champions golfers
Oral Roberts Golden Eagles men's golfers
Tulsa Golden Hurricane men's golfers
Golfers from Johannesburg
Sportspeople from Zürich
1963 births
Living people